WJAN-CD (channel 41) is a low-power, class A Spanish-language independent station licensed to Miami, Florida, United States. Owned by América CV Station Group, Inc., it is sister station to WFUN-LD (channel 48). The two stations share studios in Hialeah Gardens; WJAN-CD's transmitter is located due south of Aladdin City.

On cable, WJAN-CD is available on Comcast Xfinity channel 12 in Miami-Dade County and channel 15 in Broward County in standard-definition television, and on channel 439 in high definition. It is also carried on AT&T U-verse channel 41, and Atlantic Broadband channels 17 (SD) and 814 (HD). Nationally, WJAN-CD1 is available via streaming on channel 1106 on The Roku Channel's live TV service.

History
The station first signed on the air on June 24, 1994, as W41BF, originally broadcasting on UHF channel 41. That same year, it began broadcasting its first independently produced entertainment series produced for the U.S. Hispanic market, A Oscuras Pero Encendidos. Hosted by producer and entertainer Paul Bouche, the program became a success and in 2000, owner Omar Romay started investing in locally produced entertainment programs. In 1995, the station changed its call letters to WJAN-LP, and its license was upgraded to Class A status as WJAN-CA in 2000. By 2009, the station carried seven hours of original programming each day, and had a share of over 10% of the Spanish-language television audience in the Miami market during prime time hours.

WJAN became an affiliate of MundoFox at the network's launch on August 13, 2012, and began branding on-air as "MundoFox 41.1 & 48.2 Miami," in reference to its simulcast on WFUN-LD digital subchannel 48.2. At that time, the station's intellectual operations, known as "América TeVé" moved exclusively (with the exception of its 5 and 10 p.m. newscasts, which are simulcasted on the station), to WFUN-LD digital channel 48.1. On December 28, 2012, MundoFox announced that it would move its Miami affiliation from WJAN to Key West-based WGEN-TV (channel 8), with WJAN and WFUN reverting to independent status.

Due to the loss of the MundoFox affiliation, on January 28, 2013, WJAN-CD and WFUN-LD launched a new programming format called Teveo, which is stylized as a 24-hour news channel that airs each weekday from 5:00 p.m. to 12:00 a.m. and weekends from 7:00 to 11:00 p.m. "Teveo" carries all of the station's live newscasts, along with rebroadcasts of its 6:00 and 11:00 p.m. newscasts and its public affairs programs including A Mano Limpia and Sevcec a Fondo. It also added live weekday hour-long 7:00 and 9:00 p.m. newscasts on that date, making it the only station in South Florida with newscasts in those timeslots (the 9:00 p.m. newscast was later canceled on April 12, 2013, to make way for a news/talk program that debuted the following Monday). On weekends, "Teveo" carries a "week-in-review" selection of its news programs. Paid programming is shown at other times of the day. The channel is simulcast on WJAN digital channel 41.1, and is carried on Comcast channel 82, Atlantic Broadband channel 3 and AT&T U-verse channel 41.

Digital television

Digital channels
The station's digital signal is multiplexed:

WFUN-LD (which was previously programmed separately from WJAN) is simulcast on digital subchannel 41.1. WJAN-CD serves viewers in most of Miami-Dade County, while WFUN-LD serves viewers in North Miami-Dade and Broward Counties.

References

External links

Hispanic and Latino American culture in Miami
JAN-CD
Television channels and stations established in 1994
JAN-CD
Low-power television stations in the United States
1994 establishments in Florida